Vladyslav Bilyi (born 26 November 1997) is a Ukrainian Paralympic athlete specializing in javelin throw. He represented Ukraine at the 2020 Summer Paralympics.

Career
Bilyi represented Ukraine in the javelin throw F38 event at the 2020 Summer Paralympics and won a silver medal.

References 

1997 births
Living people
Sportspeople from Dnipro
Ukrainian male javelin throwers
Paralympic athletes of Ukraine
Medalists at the World Para Athletics European Championships
Athletes (track and field) at the 2020 Summer Paralympics
Medalists at the 2020 Summer Paralympics
Paralympic medalists in athletics (track and field)
Paralympic silver medalists for Ukraine
21st-century Ukrainian people